Stefan Schnoor (born 18 April 1971) is a German former professional footballer who played as a defender.

Career
Schnoor was born in Neumünster. He made his name at Hamburger SV but left the club on a free transfer in 1998 to join Derby County. After two and a half years in England, scoring twice against Leicester City and Leeds United, he returned to Germany with VfL Wolfsburg in a swap deal involving Brian O'Neil. After that he played for Holstein Kiel where he ended his playing career in 2007. In 2010 Schnoor returned to active play for one season in the fifth tier Oberliga with Hamburg amateur side Germania Schnelsen.

As of February 2009, he is a player agent. His agency, Kick and Rush GmbH, represents, among others, Colin Kazim-Richards, Mathias Jørgensen, Marcus Tudgay, Giles Barnes, Christopher Poulsen and Wayne Routledge.

Schnoor also works as a pundit for German TV station Sport1.

References

External links
 
 
 His agency Kick and Rush GmbH
 Stefan Schnoor Interview

1971 births
Living people
People from Neumünster
German footballers
Footballers from Schleswig-Holstein
Association football defenders
Bundesliga players
Premier League players
Hamburger SV players
Hamburger SV II players
Derby County F.C. players
Holstein Kiel players
VfL Wolfsburg players
German expatriate footballers
German expatriate sportspeople in England
Expatriate footballers in England